Petr Jelínek (born 19 June 1984) is a Czech professional ice hockey forward who currently plays for HC Bílí Tygři Liberec of the Czech Extraliga.

Jelínek played previously also for Moose Jaw Warriors, Prince George Cougars, HC Slovan Ústečtí Lvi, HC Slavia Praha, HC Rebel Havlíčkův Brod and MšHK Žilina.

His father Tomáš played mainly for HC Sparta Praha and won an Olympic bronze medal with Czechoslovakia in 1992, and elder brother Tomáš Jr played mainly in the domestic lower leagues and in France.

References

External links

1984 births
Living people
HC Slavia Praha players
Czech ice hockey forwards
Ice hockey people from Prague
HC Bílí Tygři Liberec players
BK Havlíčkův Brod players
HC Slovan Ústečtí Lvi players
MsHK Žilina players
Port Huron Flags (IHL) players
Roanoke Valley Vipers players
Prince George Cougars players
Moose Jaw Warriors players
Czech expatriate ice hockey players in the United States
Czech expatriate ice hockey players in Canada
Czech expatriate ice hockey players in Slovakia